Pediasia ramexita is a moth in the family Crambidae. It was described by Stanisław Błeszyński in 1965. It is found in Tibet, China.

References

Crambini
Moths described in 1965
Moths of Asia